Jois is a make of Indian brandy, manufactured by Amrut Distilleries, most popular in the states of Kerala and Karnataka. It is part of Amrut's Indian Made Foreign Liquor (IMFL) portfolio.

See also
 Amrut Distilleries
 Amrut
 List of Indian beverages

References

Brandies
Alcoholic drink brands